Aurimas Vertelis (born 6 September 1986) is a Lithuanian footballer who plays as a left winger.

In January 2014, he joined FC Botoșani in the Romanian Liga I.

Honours

Club
FK Ekranas 
A Lyga: 2011, 2012
Lithuanian Football Cup: 2010–11

References

External links
 Official FC Botoșani profile  
 
 Profile at futbolinis.lt

1986 births
Living people
Lithuanian footballers
Association football midfielders
FBK Kaunas footballers
FK Ekranas players
Liga I players
FC Botoșani players
Lithuanian expatriate footballers
Expatriate footballers in Romania
Lithuanian expatriate sportspeople in Romania
FK Dainava Alytus players